Alfred Bernhard Nobel (21 October 1833 – 10 December 1896) was a Swedish chemist, engineer, inventor, businessman, and philanthropist. He is best known for having bequeathed his fortune to establish the Nobel Prize, though he also made several important contributions to science, holding 355 patents in his lifetime. Nobel's most famous invention was dynamite, a safer and easier means of harnessing the explosive power of nitroglycerin; it was patented in 1867.

Nobel displayed an early aptitude for science and learning, particularly in chemistry and languages; he became fluent in six languages and filed his first patent at age 24. He embarked on many business ventures with his family, most notably owning Bofors, an iron and steel producer that he developed into a major manufacturer of cannons and other armaments.

Nobel was later inspired to donate his fortune to the Nobel Prize institution, which would annually recognize those who "conferred the greatest benefit to humankind". The synthetic element nobelium was named after him, and his name and legacy also survives in companies such as Dynamit Nobel and AkzoNobel, which descend from mergers with companies he founded.

Nobel was elected a member of the Royal Swedish Academy of Sciences, which, pursuant to his will, would be responsible for choosing the Nobel laureates in physics and in chemistry.

Personal life

Early life and education 

Alfred Nobel was born in Stockholm, United Kingdoms of Sweden and Norway on 21 October 1833. He was the third son of Immanuel Nobel (1801–1872), an inventor and engineer, and Karolina Andriette Nobel (née Ahlsell 1805–1889). The couple married in 1827 and had eight children. The family was impoverished and only Alfred and his three brothers survived beyond childhood. Through his father, Alfred Nobel was a descendant of the Swedish scientist Olaus Rudbeck (1630–1702), and in his turn, the boy was interested in engineering, particularly explosives, learning the basic principles from his father at a young age. Alfred Nobel's interest in technology was inherited from his father, an alumnus of Royal Institute of Technology in Stockholm.Following various business failures, Nobel's father moved to Saint Petersburg, Russia and grew successful there as a manufacturer of machine tools and explosives. He invented the veneer lathe (which made possible the production of modern plywood) and started work on the torpedo. In 1842, the family joined him in the city. Now prosperous, his parents were able to send Nobel to private tutors and the boy excelled in his studies, particularly in chemistry and languages, achieving fluency in English, French, German and Russian. For 18 months, from 1841 to 1842, Nobel went to the only school he ever attended as a child, in Stockholm.

Nobel gained proficiency in Swedish, French, Russian, English, German, and Italian. He also developed sufficient literary skill to write poetry in English. His Nemesis is a prose tragedy in four acts about the Italian noblewoman Beatrice Cenci. It was printed while he was dying, but the entire stock was destroyed immediately after his death except for three copies, being regarded as scandalous and blasphemous. It was published in Sweden in 2003 and has been translated into Slovenian, French, Italian, and Spanish.

Religion 
Nobel was Lutheran and regularly attended the Church of Sweden Abroad during his Paris years, led by pastor Nathan Söderblom who received the Nobel Peace Prize in 1930. He became an agnostic in youth and was an atheist later in life, though still donated generously to the Church.

Health and relationships 
Nobel travelled for much of his business life, maintaining companies in Europe and America while keeping a home in Paris from 1873 to 1891. He remained a solitary character, given to periods of depression. He remained unmarried, although his biographers note that he had at least three loves, the first in Russia with a girl named Alexandra who rejected his proposal. In 1876, Austro-Bohemian Countess Bertha Kinsky became his secretary, but she left him after a brief stay to marry her previous lover Baron Arthur Gundaccar von Suttner. Her contact with Nobel was brief, yet she corresponded with him until his death in 1896, and probably influenced his decision to include a peace prize in his will. She was awarded the 1905 Nobel Peace prize "for her sincere peace activities". Nobel's longest-lasting relationship was with Sofija Hess from Celje whom he met in 1876. The liaison lasted for 18 years.

Residences 
In the years of 1865 to 1873, Alfred Nobel had his home in Krümmel, Hamburg, he afterward moved to a house in the Avenue Malakoff in Paris that same year.

In 1894, when he acquired Bofors-Gullspång, the Björkborn Manor was included, he stayed at his manor house in Sweden during the summers. The manor house became his very last residence in Sweden and has after his death functioned as a museum.

Alfred Nobel died on 10 December 1896, in Sanremo, Italy, at his very last residence, Villa Nobel, overlooking the Mediterranean Sea.

Scientific career
As a young man, Nobel studied with chemist Nikolai Zinin; then, in 1850, went to Paris to further the work. There he met Ascanio Sobrero, who had invented nitroglycerin three years before. Sobrero strongly opposed the use of nitroglycerin because it was unpredictable, exploding when subjected to variable heat or pressure. But Nobel became interested in finding a way to control and use nitroglycerin as a commercially usable explosive; it had much more power than gunpowder. In 1851 at age 18, he went to the United States for one year to study, working for a short period under Swedish-American inventor John Ericsson, who designed the American Civil War ironclad, USS Monitor. Nobel filed his first patent, an English patent for a gas meter, in 1857, while his first Swedish patent, which he received in 1863, was on "ways to prepare gunpowder".The family factory produced armaments for the Crimean War (1853–1856), but had difficulty switching back to regular domestic production when the fighting ended and they filed for bankruptcy. In 1859, Nobel's father left his factory in the care of the second son, Ludvig Nobel (1831–1888), who greatly improved the business. Nobel and his parents returned to Sweden from Russia and Nobel devoted himself to the study of explosives, and especially to the safe manufacture and use of nitroglycerin. Nobel invented a detonator in 1863, and in 1865 designed the blasting cap.

On 3 September 1864, a shed used for preparation of nitroglycerin exploded at the factory in Heleneborg, Stockholm, Sweden, killing five people, including Nobel's younger brother Emil. Fazed by the accident, Nobel founded the company Nitroglycerin Aktiebolaget AB in Vinterviken so that he could continue to work in a more isolated area. Nobel invented dynamite in 1867, a substance easier and safer to handle than the more unstable nitroglycerin. Dynamite was patented in the US and the UK and was used extensively in mining and the building of transport networks internationally. In 1875, Nobel invented gelignite, more stable and powerful than dynamite, and in 1887, patented ballistite, a predecessor of cordite.

Nobel was elected a member of the Royal Swedish Academy of Sciences in 1884, the same institution that would later select laureates for two of the Nobel prizes, and he received an honorary doctorate from Uppsala University in 1893.

Nobel's brothers Ludvig and Robert founded the oil company Branobel and became hugely rich in their own right. Nobel invested in these and amassed great wealth through the development of these new oil regions. During his life, Nobel was issued 355 patents internationally, and by his death, his business had established more than 90 armaments factories, despite his apparently pacifist character.

Inventions

Nobel found that when nitroglycerin was incorporated in an absorbent inert substance like kieselguhr (diatomaceous earth) it became safer and more convenient to handle, and this mixture he patented in 1867 as "dynamite". Nobel demonstrated his explosive for the first time that year, at a quarry in Redhill, Surrey, England. In order to help reestablish his name and improve the image of his business from the earlier controversies associated with dangerous explosives, Nobel had also considered naming the highly powerful substance "Nobel's Safety Powder", but settled with Dynamite instead, referring to the Greek word for "power".

Nobel later combined nitroglycerin with various nitrocellulose compounds, similar to collodion, but settled on a more efficient recipe combining another nitrate explosive, and obtained a transparent, jelly-like substance, which was a more powerful explosive than dynamite. Gelignite, or blasting gelatine, as it was named, was patented in 1876; and was followed by a host of similar combinations, modified by the addition of potassium nitrate and various other substances. Gelignite was more stable, transportable and conveniently formed to fit into bored holes, like those used in drilling and mining, than the previously used compounds. It was adopted as the standard technology for mining in the "Age of Engineering", bringing Nobel a great amount of financial success, though at a cost to his health. An offshoot of this research resulted in Nobel's invention of ballistite, the precursor of many modern smokeless powder explosives and still used as a rocket propellant.

Nobel Prize

There is a well known story about the origin of the Nobel Prize. In 1888, the death of his brother Ludvig supposedly caused several newspapers to publish obituaries of Alfred in error. One French newspaper condemned him for his invention of military explosives—in many versions of the story, dynamite is quoted, although this was mainly used for civilian applications—and this is said to have brought about his decision to leave a better legacy after his death. The obituary stated,  ("The merchant of death is dead"), and went on to say, "Dr. Alfred Nobel, who became rich by finding ways to kill more people faster than ever before, died yesterday." Nobel read the obituary and was appalled at the idea that he would be remembered in this way. His decision to posthumously donate the majority of his wealth to found the Nobel Prize has been credited to him wanting to leave behind a better legacy. However, it has been questioned whether or not the obituary in question actually existed.

On 27 November 1895, at the Swedish-Norwegian Club in Paris, Nobel signed his last will and testament and set aside the bulk of his estate to establish the Nobel Prizes, to be awarded annually without distinction of nationality. After taxes and bequests to individuals, Nobel's will allocated 94% of his total assets, 31,225,000 Swedish kronor, to establish the five Nobel Prizes. This converted to £1,687,837 (GBP) at the time. In 2012, the capital was worth around SEK 3.1 billion (US$472 million, EUR 337 million), which is almost twice the amount of the initial capital, taking inflation into account.

The first three of these prizes are awarded for eminence in physical science, in chemistry and in medical science or physiology; the fourth is for literary work "in an ideal direction" and the fifth prize is to be given to the person or society that renders the greatest service to the cause of international fraternity, in the suppression or reduction of standing armies, or in the establishment or furtherance of peace congresses.

The formulation for the literary prize being given for a work "in an ideal direction" ( in Swedish), is cryptic and has caused much confusion. For many years, the Swedish Academy interpreted "ideal" as "idealistic" and used it as a reason not to give the prize to important but less romantic authors, such as Henrik Ibsen and Leo Tolstoy. This interpretation has since been revised, and the prize has been awarded to, for example, Dario Fo and José Saramago, who do not belong to the camp of literary idealism.

There was room for interpretation by the bodies he had named for deciding on the physical sciences and chemistry prizes, given that he had not consulted them before making the will. In his one-page testament, he stipulated that the money go to discoveries or inventions in the physical sciences and to discoveries or improvements in chemistry. He had opened the door to technological awards, but had not left instructions on how to deal with the distinction between science and technology. Since the deciding bodies he had chosen were more concerned with the former, the prizes went to scientists more often than engineers, technicians or other inventors.

Sweden's central bank Sveriges Riksbank celebrated its 300th anniversary in 1968 by donating a large sum of money to the Nobel Foundation to be used to set up a sixth prize in the field of economics in honour of Alfred Nobel.  In 2001, Alfred Nobel's great-great-nephew, Peter Nobel (born 1931), asked the Bank of Sweden to differentiate its award to economists given "in Alfred Nobel's memory" from the five other awards. This request added to the controversy over whether the Bank of Sweden Prize in Economic Sciences in Memory of Alfred Nobel is actually a legitimate "Nobel Prize".

Death 

Nobel was accused of high treason against France for selling Ballistite to Italy, so he moved from Paris to Sanremo, Italy, in 1891. On 10 December 1896, he suffered a stroke and died. He had left most of his wealth in trust, unbeknownst to his family, in order to fund the Nobel Prize awards. He is buried in Norra begravningsplatsen in Stockholm.

Monuments and legacy 
The Monument to Alfred Nobel in Saint Petersburg is located along the Bolshaya Nevka River on Petrogradskaya Embankment. It was dedicated in 1991 to mark the 90th anniversary of the first Nobel Prize presentation. Diplomat Thomas Bertelman and Professor Arkady Melua were initiators of the creation of the monument (1989). Professor A. Melua has provided funds for the establishment of the monument (J.S.Co. "Humanistica", 1990–1991). The abstract metal sculpture was designed by local artists Sergey Alipov and Pavel Shevchenko, and appears to be an explosion or branches of a tree. Petrogradskaya Embankment is the street where Nobel's family lived until 1859.

Criticism of Nobel focuses on his leading role in weapons manufacturing and sales, and some question his motives in creating his prizes, suggesting they are intended to improve his reputation.

See also
 Nobel Foundation

References

Further reading
 Schück, H, and Sohlman, R., (1929). The Life of Alfred Nobel, transl. Brian Lunn, London: William Heineman Ltd.
 Alfred Nobel US Patent No 78,317, dated 26 May 1868
 Evlanoff, M. and Fluor, M. Alfred Nobel – The Loneliest Millionaire. Los Angeles, Ward Ritchie Press, 1969.
 Sohlman, R. The Legacy of Alfred Nobel, transl. Schubert E. London: The Bodley Head, 1983 (Swedish original, Ett Testamente, published in 1950).

External links

 Alfred Nobel – Man behind the Prizes
 Biography at the Norwegian Nobel Institute
 Nobelprize.org
 Documents of Life and Activity of The Nobel Family. Under the editorship of Professor Arkady Melua. Series of books.
 "The Nobels in Baku" in Azerbaijan International, Vol 10.2 (Summer 2002), 56–59.
 The Nobel Prize in Postage Stamps
 A German branch or followup (German)
 
 
 Alfred Nobel and his unknown coworker

 
1833 births
1896 deaths
Burials at Norra begravningsplatsen
Members of the Royal Swedish Academy of Sciences
Alfred
Nobel Prize
Engineers from Stockholm
19th-century Swedish businesspeople
19th-century Swedish scientists
19th-century Swedish engineers
Swedish chemists
Swedish philanthropists
Explosives engineers
Bofors people